Desmond Barry (born 1954) is a Welsh author.

Work
Barry was born in Merthyr Tydfil and raised on the town's Gurnos estate.  He gained a place at University College London . After his degree, he taught English in Italy and then in 1986 moved to the USA where he did a bewildering array of jobs before embarking on a writing programme at Columbia University. While there, he studied under Booker prize–winner Peter Carey, and worked as Carey’s researcher on his novel Jack Maggs.

When he began writing his own debut novel, The Chivalry of Crime (Jonathan Cape, 2001), Barry did exhaustive research on Jesse James, and decided to study Stanislavski's 'system' of acting in order to relate better to the psychological aspects of James and his cohorts.

From 1999 to 2001, in the summer months, Barry worked in Tibet as part of a non-governmental organisation.

The Chivalry of Crime was voted Best First Novel of the Year by the Western Writers of America and was shortlisted for the 2002 Wales Book of the Year Award. A Bloody Good Friday (Jonathan Cape, 2002) is set in his home town in 1977. Cressida’s Bed (Jonathan Cape, 2004) made the 2005 Wales Book of the Year Long List.

His shorter prose has appeared in Granta, The New Yorker, The Big Issue and in the anthologies Wales, Half Welsh (Bloomsbury, 2004), London Noir (Serpent’s Tail, 2006) and Sea Stories (National Maritime Museum, 2007). He won a Creative Wales Award in 2006 for the Far South Project, which is ongoing. His play Jetlag was the Cardiff part of Three Cities, a trilogy of plays written in collaboration with writers from Buenos Aires and Melbourne and performed in Cardiff in 2007 at Chapter Arts Centre. Barry worked with Uruguayan photographer, Diego Vidart , to produce 'The Falkland Diaries ’, an exhibition at the Wales Millennium Centre in 2007.

Selected publications
The Chivalry of Crime (Jonathan Cape, 2001)
A Bloody Good Friday (Jonathan Cape, 2002)
Cressida’s Bed (Jonathan Cape, 2004)

Contributed to:
Wales, Half Welsh (Bloomsbury, 2004)
London Noir (Serpent’s Tail, 2006)
Sea Stories (National Maritime Museum, 2007)
Merthyr Writing! (Merthyr Tydfil County Borough Council, 2008)

Nonfiction
3:AM Magazine 
The Circular Church (or books, guns and the report on the blind) Words by Des Barry; Photography by Diego Vidart
http://www.3ammagazine.com/3am/the-circular-church-or-books-guns-and-the-report-on-the-blind/ 
The Sauna King. Words by Des Barry; Photography by Kristian Helgesen 
http://www.3ammagazine.com/3am/the-sauna-king/ 
William Burroughs and the Dreamscapes of the Dalai Lama
http://www.3ammagazine.com/3am/william-burroughs-and-the-dreamscapes-of-the-dalai-lama/

References
Academi (Welsh literature promotion)
Wales Arts International 
British Council 
Smith, Dai, Top 10 Welsh Alternatives to Dylan Thomas, The Guardian, 12/2/06 

1954 births
Living people
Welsh novelists
People from Merthyr Tydfil